The Brazilian Paralympic Committee (BPC;  – CPB) is the private, non-profit organization representing Brazilian Paralympic athletes in the Paralympic Games and the Parapan American Games. It is the governing body of Brazilian Paralympic sport.

See also
Brazil at the Paralympics
Brazilian Olympic Committee

References

External links

Official site

National Paralympic Committees
Disability organisations based in Brazil
1995 establishments in Brazil
Sports organizations established in 1995